South Carolina Highway 186 (SC 186) is a  state highway in the U.S. state of South Carolina. The highway connects rural areas of Pickens County with Slater-Marietta in Greenville County.

Route description
SC 186 begins at an intersection with SC 8 (Pumpkintown Highway) northeast of Pickens, within Pickens County. It travels to the east-northeast and curves to the southeast before crossing over Shoal Creek. Farther to the east is an intersection with SC 135 (Dacusville Highway). The highway curves to the northeast and travels through Dacusville. SC 186 curves to the north and crosses over Shoal Creek again. It curves to the northeast and crosses over the Saluda River on an unnamed bridge, which marks the Greenville County line. Upon crossing over Beaverdam Creek, the highway enters Slater-Marietta. A short distance later, it meets its eastern terminus, an intersection with U.S. Route 276 (US 276; Geer Highway).

Major intersections

See also

References

External links

SC 186 at Virginia Highways' South Carolina Highways Annex

186
Transportation in Pickens County, South Carolina
Transportation in Greenville County, South Carolina